Motor Toon Grand Prix 2 is a racing video game released in 1996. It was developed by a development group within SCE that later formed Polyphony Digital. It was released in the US as Motor Toon Grand Prix and Japan as Motor Toon Grand Prix USA Edition, since its predecessor never left Japan, although the European version kept the original Japanese title for unknown reasons. In 2002, the game was re-released in Europe in a Twin Pack with Gran Turismo, Kazunori Yamauchi's following game. In 2010, the game was re-released on PlayStation Network.

The game is compatible with Namco's neGcon analogue controller.

Characters
Captain Rock (Pilot)
Bolbox (Robot)
Penguin Bros. (Mafia Penguins)
Princess Jean (Spoiled Princess)
Raptor & Raptor (Extra-Terrestrials)
Ching Tong Chang (Chinese race car driver)
Vanity (Motor-bike driver)
Billy the tough (Train Driver)

Raptor & Raptor drive faster in reverse, and the left/right controls are not reversed whilst doing so.

Reception

Motor Grand Prix 2 received positive reviews, with critics generally praising the comedic power-ups and eye-catching graphics, and commenting that underneath the game's cartoonish exterior are genuinely solid racing gameplay and controls. GamePro criticized that selecting power-ups from the spinning menu can be awkward, but summarized that, "It's slick, fast, and, yes, goofy fun for real race fans." Hugh Sterbakov wrote in GameSpot that while the lack of a split screen multiplayer is a problem, the game overall "delivers for kids and kids-at-heart alike." Todd Mowatt of Electronic Gaming Monthly called it "an excellent racing game that any fan of this genre, young or old, can enjoy."

Next Generation reviewed the game, and stated that "Motor Toon is fast, gorgeous, and very different from anything else seen in the U.S. (besides gray market copies of the original Motor Toon, of course). What more could you want?"

References

External links

1996 video games
PlayStation Network games
PlayStation 3 games
PlayStation (console) games
Kart racing video games
Racing video games
Sony Interactive Entertainment games
Multiplayer and single-player video games
Video games developed in Japan
Polyphony Digital games